Andon Petrov (born 29 April 1955) is a Bulgarian former cyclist. He competed in the individual road race event at the 1980 Summer Olympics, but did not finish.

References

External links
 

1955 births
Living people
Bulgarian male cyclists
Olympic cyclists of Bulgaria
Cyclists at the 1980 Summer Olympics
Place of birth missing (living people)